Harlon Jason Klaasen (born ) is a South African rugby union player who last played for the  in the Pro14. He is a utility back that can play as a centre, wing or fullback.

Boland Cavaliers

Klaasen was born in Malmesbury. and represented local provincial side  at youth level, starting at Under-19 level in the 2012 Under-19 Provincial Championship.

He scored two tries in seven appearances for Boland in the 2015 Vodacom Cup, but didn't feature in the Currie Cup competition.

Hamiltons and Western Province

Klaasen then played amateur club rugby for Hamiltons in 's Super League A competition, where he finished as the 2016 competition's top scorer with 14 tries, earning a contract with Western Province for their 2017 Rugby Challenge squad. He made five appearances, four of them off the bench, for the team that went on to win the competition, beating  in the final.

Eastern Province Kings and Southern Kings

He was called into the  squad for their 2017–18 Pro14 campaign and was named on the bench for their match against Welsh side , coming off the bench to score a try and secure a losing bonus point for the Southern Kings in the 30–34 defeat. He made his first start a week later, scoring another try in a defeat to Scottish side .

References

South African rugby union players
Living people
1993 births
People from Malmesbury, Western Cape
Rugby union centres
Rugby union wings
Rugby union fullbacks
Boland Cavaliers players
Eastern Province Elephants players
Southern Kings players
Western Province (rugby union) players
Griquas (rugby union) players
Rugby union players from the Western Cape